Spirits in the Field, is a live album by saxophonist Arthur Blythe which was recorded at Bimhuis in Amsterdam in 1999 and released on the Savant label the following year.

Reception

In his review on Allmusic, Michael G. Nastos stated: "Blythe's husky, virile alto sax has never sounded better, and though the recording quality is a little thin, the music comes roaring through the speakers nonetheless. ... Blythe's sound and vision remain as fresh and vital as ever.". In JazzTimes, Peter Margasak wrote: "this live recording puts the focus squarely on his music, finding it as strong, soulful and thrilling as ever".

Track listing 
All compositions by Arthur Blythe except where noted
 "One Mint Julip" (Rudy Toombs) – 6:33
 "Miss Nancy" – 7:26
 "Odessa" – 10:59
 "Rambler" (Bob Stewart) – 9:29
 "Spirits in the Field" – 3:24
 "Lenox Avenue Breakdown" – 6:37
 "Ah, George, We Hardly Knew Ya" (Don Pullen) – 7:23
 "Break Tune" – 5:55

Personnel 
Arthur Blythe – alto saxophone
Bob Stewart – tuba
Cecil Brooks III – drums

References 

Arthur Blythe live albums
2000 live albums
Savant Records live albums